Lieutenant Amadou Konaré is one of the leaders and spokesperson of the National Committee for the Restoration of Democracy and State which forced out President Amadou Toumani Touré after the 2012 Malian coup d'état.

References

Malian military personnel
Year of birth missing (living people)
Living people
21st-century Malian people